Bernard Aloysius Kiernan Hughes (July 16, 1915 – July 11, 2006), known professionally as Barnard Hughes, was an American actor of television, theater and film. Hughes became famous for a variety of roles; his most notable roles came after middle age, and he was often cast as a dithering authority figure or grandfatherly elder.

Personal life

Hughes was born in Bedford Hills, New York, the son of Irish immigrants Marcella "Madge" (née Kiernan) and Owen Hughes. He attended La Salle Academy and Manhattan College in New York City.  Hughes served in the United States Army during World War II.  Hughes was married to actress Helen Stenborg. They married on April 19, 1950, and remained married until his death. Hughes was five days shy of his 91st birthday when he died. The Hugheses had two children, the theatre director Doug Hughes, and a daughter, Laura. Hughes and his wife are interred at Church of the Transfiguration, Episcopal (Manhattan) in New York City.

Hughes spoke to Dick Cavett on his show, revealing that he was inspired by seeing actor Dennis King on Broadway as Richard II in the play  "Richard of Bordeaux" by Gordon Daviot (Elizabeth Mackintosh).  Hughes changed the "e" in his first name to an "a" to help his acting career on the advice of a numerologist. Through high school and college, Hughes worked a series of odd jobs, including a stint as a dockworker and as a salesman at Macy's. He auditioned for the Shakespeare Fellowship Repertory company in New York City on the advice of a friend, and ended up joining the company for two years.

Hughes played more than 400 theatre roles, including the one for which he was perhaps most famous, in Hugh Leonard's Da. He won Broadway's 1978 Tony Award as Best Actor for his portrayal of the title role; in 1988 he recreated the role for the film Da.

On screen, he appeared in the film transcription of Hamlet (1964), and also appeared in such films as Midnight Cowboy (1969), Where's Poppa? (1970), Cold Turkey (1971) The Hospital (1971), Tron (1982), Maxie (1985), The Lost Boys (1987), Da (1988) - the screen reprise of his most successful stage-role, Doc Hollywood (1991) and the big success Sister Act 2: Back in the Habit (1993). He also played the old man who gave a ride to Felix and Oscar in The Odd Couple II (1998) and was featured in The Fantasticks (1995).

Hughes appeared on TV in such series as Naked City, The Secret Storm, Dark Shadows, Love Story, Blossom, and Homicide: Life on the Street. In 1973, he had a notable recurring role on All in the Family as a Roman Catholic priest, Father John Majeski, doing battle with Archie Bunker, and won an Emmy for his portrayal of a senile judge on Lou Grant. Hughes made three appearances in The Bob Newhart Show as the father of Dr. Robert Hartley. He was the central character in three sitcoms: Doc, in which he played a physician; Mr. Merlin, in which he played Merlin, a magician mentoring a 20th-century teenager; and The Cavanaughs, co-starring Christine Ebersole, in which he played the family patriarch (Art Carney played his brother, and Glynis Johns made guest appearances). Hughes sang "Danny Boy" in one episode of the latter series. He also made a memorable appearance as The King (with Jim Dale as The Duke) in the PBS mini-series Adventures of Huckleberry Finn.

Hughes also made recurring appearances on daytime dramas including Guiding Light and As the World Turns as well as a brief appearance as a private investigator in an early episode of Dark Shadows. He also did voice-overs for television commercials advertising Kix cereal.

Death
Hughes died of natural causes on July 11, 2006, five days before his 91st birthday.

Selected filmography

Stage productions

 "Osgood Meeker" in the Broadway production of Noël Coward's little-known play Waiting in the Wings, directed by Michael Langham (this was Barnard Hughes' last stage role)
 "Old Man" in the Broadway production of Prelude to a Kiss, directed by Norman René
 Polonius to Stacy Keach's Hamlet
 Marcellus in Richard Burton's 1964 Hamlet
 Dogberry in the New York Shakespeare Festival production of Much Ado About Nothing
 Harry Hope in the 1985 Broadway revival of The Iceman Cometh directed by José Quintero
 Uncle Vanya (directed by Mike Nichols)
 A Doll's House
 Hogan's Goat (Off-Broadway)
 Three Sisters
 The Devil's Disciple
 Translations
 "Lynn Belvedere" in the Tenthouse Theatre in the Round production of Gwen Davenport's "Belvedere" August 9–14, 1948.

References

External links
 
 
 
 
 Barnard Hughes and Helen Stenborg papers, 1880s-2011, held by Billy Rose Theatre Division, New York Public Library for the Performing Arts.

1915 births
2006 deaths
American people of Irish descent
Male actors from New York City
American male film actors
American male stage actors
American male television actors
Emmy Award winners
Drama Desk Award winners
Manhattan College alumni
People from Bedford Hills, New York
Tony Award winners
20th-century American male actors